The Finland national long track team is the national long track motorcycle racing team of Finland and is controlled by the Finnish Motorcycling Federation (SML). The team was started in all editions of Team Long Track World Championship, but they never won a championship medal.

Competition

Riders 
Riders who started in Team Long Track World Championship Finals:

 Markus Helin (2007)
 Jan-Eric Korkemaki (2008)
 Joonas Kylmäkorpi (2009)
 Kaj Laukanen (2008, 2009)
 Rene Lehtinen (2007, 2008, 2009)
 Aki-Pekka Mustonen (2008, 2009)
 Mikko Rahko (2007)

See also 
 Finland national speedway team

External links 
 (fi) Finnish Motorcycling Federation webside

National long track teams
Speedway
Team